Por que você partiu? is a 2013 Brazilian documentary film directed by Eric Belhassen.

The film follows the lives of five chefs of French cuisine who reside in Brazil, based on their family histories. With the chefs Emmanuel Bassoleil, Erick Jacquin, Laurent Suaudeau, Alain Uzan and Frédéric Monnier.

References

2010s Portuguese-language films
2010s French-language films
Brazilian documentary films
Films shot in France
Documentary films about immigration
2013 documentary films
2013 films
Films about chefs
2013 multilingual films
Brazilian multilingual films